The Church of Tonga (Siasi ʻo Tonga) is one of the churches in Tonga. It is located in the capital Nukualofa.

It was established in 1929 by those members who did not agree to the unification in 1924 of the Wesleyan mission and the Free church into the Free Wesleyan Church of Tonga, and they also did not agree with the schism of 1929 when the Free Church of Tonga broke away. So they broke away too, and were fully established the year after, 1929.

To avoid confusion with the Free Church of Tonga, this church is colloquially known as the Church of the Lords.
After the death of Siaosi Fīnau Mīsini in 1938, his son, Siaosi Tangata ʻo Haʻamea became the next president, until he died too in 1960. It is remarkable that despite that Vavaʻu is the estate of ʻUlukālala, the Church of Tonga is only very small there.

The Current Leader of the Church is Reverend Dr Tu'ipulotu Lofitu Katoanga, who has been President of the Church since 2012 replacing Reverend Dr Tevita Feke Mafi. Dr Katoanga is a Former Principal of Tonga College, he retired from the Government's Ministry of Education to take up his post prior to his presidency which was to become the Secretary General of the Church while Dr Mafi was President. He is also a son of a Former President of the Church, the Late Reverend Finau Katoanga. The Current Secretary General of the Church is Reverend Siosiua Siola'a.

References

Christian organizations established in 1928
Churches in Tonga